Alexander Osipenko may refer to:

 Alexander Osipenko (athlete) (born 1984), Russian ice hockey player. 
 Alexander Osipenko (pilot) (1910–1991), Soviet military aviator